FC Kontu is a football club from Helsinki, Finland. It serves Kontula in East Helsinki and the immediately surrounding area. The club was formed in 1967 under the name Kontulan Urheilijat (abbreviated KontU), the name being changed in 1994. The men's football first team currently plays in the Kolmonen (Third Division) and their home ground is at the Kontulan liikuntapuisto.  The club also run a Ladies team that play at the same level in Women's Football.

Background

The club was founded in 1967 and has specialised in the sports of football, ice hockey, basketball and bowling during its history.  The club has concentrated exclusively on football since 1992.  In its early years the club played in the lower divisions of the Finnish football league but were promoted from the Kolmonen (Third Division) in 1983 and from the Kakkonen (Second Division) in 1985.

FC Kontu (formerly Kontulan Urheilijat) has played 10 seasons in the Ykkönen (First Division), the second tier of Finnish football in the years 1986–91 and 1993–96.  They also have had five spells covering 12 seasons in the third tier, the Kakkonen (Second Division), in 1984–85, 1992, 1997, 1999–2000, 2003–08. The highest ever attendance for a KontU match was in 1986 when 5,547 people attended the home game with Kemin Palloseura.

The Ladies Team gained promotion to the Women's Premier Division (Naisten SM-sarja) in 1986 where they remained until the 2000 season when they withdrew. The 1990s were a great period for the team, the highlight being in 1993 when KontU won the Naisten SM-sarja championship. They were unsuccessful in the Premier Division/Division One 2001 promotion/relegation group and the Premier Division/Division One 2003 promotion/relegation playoff .  However luck was on the club’ side and they inherited the place of HJK-J Helsinki in the Premier Division for the 2004 season.  The team gained only 1 point in 18 games and were relegated again.

The Ladies Team bounced back a few years later winning promotion to the Premier Division (now known as the Kansallainen Liiga) at the end of the 2007 season. In 2008 they finished in a meritable 5th position in the Naisten Liiga but sadly withdrew for the 2009 season. The team now play at 3 levels lower in the Kolmonen (Third Division).

FC Kontu has a total of around 700 registered players

Season to season

Club Structure
FC Kontu Itä-Helsinki run a large number of teams including 5 men's teams, 2 ladies teams, 1 veteran's team, 10 boys teams and 5 girls teams.

2010 season
FC Kontu Men's Team are competing in Section 3 (Lohko 3) of the Kolmonen (Third Division) administered by the Uusimaa SPL.  This is the fourth highest tier in the Finnish football system.  In 2009 FC Kontu finished in 8th place in Section 2 (Lohko 2) of the Kolmonen.

 FC Kontu / 2 are competing in Section 2 (Lohko 2) of the Nelonen (Fourth Division) administered by the Helsinki SPL.

 FC Kontu / 4 are competing in Section 2 (Lohko 2) of the Kutonen (Sixth Division) administered by the Helsinki SPL.

 FC Kontu / HSP are competing in Section 2 (Lohko 2) of the Seiska (Seventh Division) administered by the Helsinki SPL.

 FC Kontu / 3 are competing in Section 3 (Lohko 3) of the Seiska (Seventh Division) administered by the Helsinki SPL.

References and Sources
Official Website
Finnish Wikipedia
Suomen Cup
FC Kontu Facebook

Footnotes

Football clubs in Helsinki
Association football clubs established in 1967
1967 establishments in Finland